Colombian-American singer Kali Uchis has released three studio albums, three extended plays, one mixtape, 16 singles (as well as six as a featured artist) and thirteen music videos.

Studio albums

Mixtapes

Extended plays

Singles

As lead artist

As featured artist

Promotional singles

Other charted and certified songs

Videography

Guest appearances

Footnotes

References

Discographies of Colombian artists
Latin pop music discographies